The Lorax (also known as Dr. Seuss' The Lorax) is a 2012 American 3D computer-animated musical fantasy comedy film produced by Illumination Entertainment and distributed by Universal Pictures. The second screen adaptation of Dr. Seuss' 1971 children's book of the same name following the 1972 animated television special, the film was directed by Chris Renaud, co-directed by Kyle Balda (in his feature directorial debut), and produced by Chris Meledandri and Janet Healy, with Ken Daurio, Cinco Paul, and Seuss' widow Audrey Geisel serving as executive producers. Paul and Daurio also wrote the film’s screenplay. The film stars the voices of Danny DeVito, Ed Helms, Zac Efron, Taylor Swift, Rob Riggle, Jenny Slate, and Betty White. It builds on the book by expanding the story of the Lorax and Ted, the previously unnamed boy who visits the Once-ler.

The Lorax had its world premiere at Universal Studios in Hollywood on February 19, 2012, and was theatrically released in the United States by Universal Pictures on March 2. It received mixed reviews from critics who praised its animation, musical score, and voice acting but criticized its characters and story. It also received backlash for its marketing, noting its contradictions to the book's message. The film grossed $349 million worldwide on a $70 million budget.

Plot

Twelve-year-old Ted Wiggins lives in Thneedville, a walled city where all vegetation is artificial. Ted is infatuated with a teenage girl named Audrey and decides to impress her with a "real tree". His grandmother, Norma, tells him about the Once-ler, who knows what happened to the trees. Ted leaves Thneedville and discovers that the outside world is a barren, contaminated wasteland. He finds the Once-ler, who agrees to tell Ted the story of the trees over multiple visits. The next time he leaves town, Ted encounters Thneedville's greedy mayor, Aloysius O'Hare, whose company sells bottled oxygen. Explaining that trees and the oxygen they produce pose a threat to his business, O'Hare intimidates Ted to stay in town, but Ted continues to visit the Once-ler.

The Once-ler recounts how, as a young inventor, he arrived in a lush forest of Truffula Trees. Upon chopping down a tree, he was confronted by the Lorax, the self-proclaimed "guardian of the forest." After attempting to force the Once-ler out, the Lorax made him promise not to cut down any more trees. The Once-ler used the Truffula fibers to create the "Thneed", a knitted garment with numerous uses, which became a major success. He harvested the Truffula tufts in a sustainable manner until his unscrupulous relatives persuaded him to resume cutting down trees to speed up production, leading to large profits, but also deforestation and pollution. After the final Truffula tree fell, the Once-ler was ruined and abandoned by his family. With the region uninhabitable, the Lorax sent the native animals away and vanished into the sky, leaving behind a pile of rocks etched with the word "Unless". 

The Once-ler gives Ted the last Truffula seed and tells him to plant it and make others care about trees. Ted returns home to plant the seed, but is spotted by O'Hare's city-wide surveillance system. Enlisting the help of Audrey and his family, Ted flees to the center of town with the seed. O'Hare rallies the citizens against Ted, claiming that trees are dangerous and filthy. Ted uses a bulldozer to knock down a section of the city wall, revealing the environmental desolation outside. Inspired by Ted's conviction, the crowd turns on O'Hare, whose henchmen banish him, and the seed is finally planted.

As time passes, the land begins to recover. New trees sprout, animals start to return, and the Once-ler reunites with the Lorax. The film ends with a quote from Dr. Seuss: "Unless someone like you cares a whole awful lot, nothing is going to get better. It's not".

Cast
 Danny DeVito as The Lorax, a mystical orange furry creature with a yellow moustache, who both protects the truffula forest and acts as a voice of reason
 Ed Helms as The Once-ler, a reclusive old man and former inventor
 Zac Efron as Ted Wiggins, an idealistic 12-year-old boy He is named after the author of the book, Dr. Seuss (Theodor Geisel)
 Taylor Swift as Audrey, Ted's love interest She is named after Audrey Geisel, Dr. Seuss's wife
 Rob Riggle as Aloysius O'Hare, the diminutive and greedy mayor of Thneedville and head of the "O'Hare Air" company that supplies fresh air to Thneedville residents
 Jenny Slate as Mrs. Wiggins, Ted's neurotic mother and Grammy Norma's daughter
 Betty White as Grammy Norma, Ted's wise-cracking grandmother and Mrs. Wiggins's mother
 Nasim Pedrad as Isabella, the Once-ler's mother
 Stephen Tobolowsky as Uncle Ubb, the Once-ler's uncle
 Elmarie Wendel as Aunt Grizelda, the Once-ler's aunt. This was Wendel's final film role before her death on July 21, 2018
 Danny Cooksey as Brett and Chet, the Once-ler's twin brothers
 Joel Swetow as the 1st Marketing Guy
 Michael Beattie as the 2nd Marketing Guy
 Dave B. Mitchell as the 1st Commercial Guy
 Dempsey Pappion as the 2nd Commercial Guy
 Chris Renaud as assorted forest animals

Production
The film is the fourth feature film based on a book by Dr. Seuss, the second fully computer-animated adaptation (the first one being Horton Hears a Who!), and the first to be released in 3D. The Lorax was also Illumination's first film presented in IMAX 3D (known as "IMAX Tree-D" in publicity for the film). The idea for the film was initiated by Audrey Geisel, Dr. Seuss's wife, who had an established partnership with Chris Meledandri, the producer of the film, from a collaboration on Horton Hears a Who!. Geisel approached Meledandri when he launched Illumination Entertainment, saying "This is the one I want to do next". The film was officially announced in July 2009, with Meledandri attached as the producer and Geisel as the executive producer. Chris Renaud and Kyle Balda were announced as the director and co-director of the film, while Cinco Paul and Ken Daurio, the duo who wrote the script for Horton Hears a Who!, were set to write the screenplay. In 2010, Danny DeVito was cast as the voice of Lorax character.

The film was fully produced at the French studio Illumination Mac Guff, which was the animation department of Mac Guff, acquired by Illumination Entertainment in the summer of 2011. DeVito reprised his role in five different languages, including the original English audio, and also for the Russian, German, Italian, Catalan/Valencian, Castillan Spanish and Latin Spanish dub editions, learning his lines phonetically. Universal added an environmental message to the film's website after a fourth-grade class in Brookline, Massachusetts, launched a successful petition through Change.org.

Release
The film was released on March 2, 2012, in the United States and Canada. It was later released on July 27 in the United Kingdom. It was also the first film to feature the current Universal Pictures logo, with a rearranged version of the fanfare, originally composed by Jerry Goldsmith and arranged by Brian Tyler, as part of the studio's 100th anniversary.

Marketing controversy
Despite the original Lorax being made as a critique of capitalism and pollution, Mazda used the likeness of The Loraxs setting and characters in an advertisement for their CX-5 SUV. This was seen by some as the complete opposite of the work's original meaning. In response, Stephanie Sperber, president of Universal partnerships and licensing, said Universal chose to partner with the Mazda CX-5 because it is "a really good choice for consumers to make who may not have the luxury or the money to buy electric or buy hybrid. It's a way to take the better environmental choice to everyone."

The film has also been used to sell Seventh Generation disposable diapers. In total, Illumination Entertainment struck more than 70 different product integration deals for the film, including IHOP, Whole Foods and the United States Environmental Protection Agency.

Home media
The film was released on DVD and Blu-ray Disc on August 7, 2012.

Mini-movies
Three mini-movies were released on the Lorax Blu-ray/DVD Combo Pack on August 7, 2012: Serenade, Wagon Ho!, and Forces of Nature.

Serenade
Lou wants to impress a girl Barbaloot, but he has some competition.

Wagon Ho!
Barbaloots Pipsqueak and Lou take the Once-ler's wagon without his permission for a joyride.

Forces of Nature
The Lorax makes Pipsqueak an "Honorary Lorax" and they team up to try to scare the Once-ler.

Video game
Blockdot created a mobile puzzle game based on the film, titled Truffula Shuffula. The game was released on February 1, 2012, for iOS and Android platforms.

Reception

Critical response
The site's critical consensus reads, "Dr. Seuss' The Lorax is cute and funny enough but the moral simplicity of the book gets lost with the zany Hollywood production values." On Metacritic, the film achieved a score of 46 out of 100 based on reviews from 30 critics, indicating "mixed or average reviews". Audiences polled by CinemaScore gave the film an average grade of "A" on an A+ to F scale.

New York magazine film critic David Edelstein on NPR's All Things Considered strongly objected to the film, arguing that the Hollywood animation and writing formulas washed out the spirit of the book. He wrote that this kind of animated feature was wrong for the source material. Demonstrating how the book's text was used in the film in this excerpt from the review, Edelstein discusses Audrey describing the truffula trees to Ted:

The film also garnered some positive reviews from critics such as Richard Roeper, who called it a "solid piece of family entertainment". Roger Moore of the Pittsburgh Tribune called the film "a feast of bright, Seuss colors, and wonderful Seuss design", and supported its environmentalist message.

Box office
The film grossed $214.4 million in North America, and $134.8 million in other countries, for a worldwide total of $349.2 million.

The film topped the North American box office with $17.5 million on its opening day (Friday, March 2, 2012). During the weekend, it grossed $70.2 million, easily beating the other new nationwide release, Project X ($21 million), and all other films. This was the biggest opening for an Illumination Entertainment film, and for a feature film adaptation of a book by Dr. Seuss, as well as the second-largest for an environmentalist film. It also scored the third-best debut for a film opening in March, and the eighth-best of all time for an animated film. The Lorax stayed at No. 1 the following weekend, dropping 45% to $38.8 million and beating all new nationwide releases, including Disney's John Carter (second place).

On April 11, 2012, it became the first animated film in nearly a year to gross more than $200 million in North America, since Walt Disney Animation Studios' Tangled.

Music

The soundtrack for the film was composed by John Powell, who had previously composed the score for Horton Hears a Who! (2008), and the songs were written by Cinco Paul. There were two soundtrack albums released for the film. One being Powell's film score and the other being the original songs written by Powell and Paul performed by various artists. Original songs written for the film include "Thneedville", "This is the Place", "Everybody Needs a Thneed", "How Bad Can I Be?", and "Let It Grow".

See also
 List of films based on Dr. Seuss books

References

External links

 
 
 
 
 

2012 films
2012 3D films
2012 computer-animated films
2010s American animated films
2010s fantasy comedy films
2010s musical comedy films
American children's animated comedy films
American children's animated fantasy films
American children's animated musical films
American computer-animated films
American fantasy comedy films
American musical comedy films
American musical fantasy films
American dystopian films
Animated films based on children's books
Advertising and marketing controversies in film
Environmental films
Fictional endangered and extinct species
Films based on works by Dr. Seuss
American nonlinear narrative films
Illumination (company) animated films
IMAX films
Universal Pictures animated films
Universal Pictures films
Animated films about bears
Animated films about birds
Animated films about families
Animated films about fish
Animated films about friendship
Films about trees
Films scored by John Powell
Films set in forests
Films directed by Chris Renaud
Films with screenplays by Cinco Paul and Ken Daurio
3D animated films
2012 animated films
2010s musical fantasy films
2012 comedy films
Films produced by Chris Meledandri
Films produced by Janet Healy
2010s English-language films
Films about mother–son relationships